Moortown railway station was a railway station serving both the village of Moortown and town of Caistor in Lincolnshire, England on the line between Grimsby and Lincoln opened in 1848 and closed in 1965.

References

Disused railway stations in Lincolnshire
Railway stations in Great Britain opened in 1848
Railway stations in Great Britain closed in 1965
Former Great Central Railway stations
1848 establishments in England
1965 disestablishments in England